The 1993–94 Washington Capitals season was the Capitals' 20th season of play.

Until 2018, this season was notable as the only time the Washington Capitals ever defeated the Pittsburgh Penguins in a playoff series, as the Capitals would lose to the Penguins in 1995, 1996, 2000, 2001, 2009, 2016, and 2017 before finally beating the Penguins in 2018 on their way to their first Stanley Cup.

Offseason

Regular season

Final standings

Schedule and results

Playoffs

Quarter-finals

Semi-finals

Player statistics

Regular season
Scoring

Goaltending

Playoffs
Scoring

Goaltending

Note: GP = Games played; G = Goals; A = Assists; Pts = Points; +/- = Plus/minus; PIM = Penalty minutes; PPG=Power-play goals; SHG=Short-handed goals; GWG=Game-winning goals
      MIN=Minutes played; W = Wins; L = Losses; T = Ties; GA = Goals against; GAA = Goals against average; SO = Shutouts; SA=Shots against; SV=Shots saved; SV% = Save percentage;

Awards and records

Transactions

Draft picks
Washington's draft picks at the 1993 NHL Entry Draft held at the Quebec Coliseum in Quebec City, Quebec.

Farm teams

See also
 1993–94 NHL season

References

External links
 

W
W
Washington Capitals seasons
Cap
Cap